Illinois's 6th congressional district covers parts of Cook and DuPage counties. It has been represented by Democrat Sean Casten since 2019.

Geographic boundaries

2011 redistricting
As of the 2011 redistricting which followed the 2010 census. All or parts of Algonquin, Barrington, Barrington Hills, Bartlett, Burr Ridge, Carol Stream, Carpentersville, Cary, Clarendon Hills, Crystal Lake, Darien, Deer Park, Downers Grove, Elgin, East Dundee, Forest Lake, Fox River Grove, Gilberts, Glen Ellyn, Hawthorn Woods, Hinsdale, Hoffman Estates, Inverness, Kildeer, Lake Barrington, Lake in the Hills, Lake Zurich, Lakewood, Lisle, Lombard, Long Grove, Naperville, North Barrington, Oak Brook, Oakbrook Terrace, Oakwood Hills, Palatine, Port Barrington, Rolling Meadows, Sleepy Hollow, South Barrington, South Elgin, St. Charles, Tower Lakes, Trout Valley, Warrenville, Wayne, West Chicago, West Dundee, Westmont, Wheaton, Willowbrook and Winfield are included.

2021 redistricting

Due to the 2020 redistricting, the district will shift from northern Cook County and southern Lake County to a primarily southern Cook County district and part of DuPage County, as well as part of the Far Southwest Side of Chicago.

The 6th district takes in the Chicago neighborhoods of Beverly; most of Mount Greenwood; and western Garfield Ridge and Clearing. 

Outside of Chicago, the 6th district takes in the Cook County communities of Orland Hills, Western Springs, Orland Park, Palos Hills, Hickory Hills, Chicago Ridge, Bridgeview, Willow Springs, and Indian Head Park; northern Tinley Park; and the western and eastern portions of Evergreen Park.

DuPage County is split between this district, the 3rd district, 4th district, and the 11th district. The 6th and 3rd districts are partitioned by 59th St, Illinois Highway 83, 55th St, Walker Ave, Park Ave, Golf Ave, Jane Ct, Prospect Ave, Chicago Ave, Middaugh Rd, Naperville Rd, Hinsdale Golf Course, Illinois Highway 34, Robert Kingery Highway, Oak Brook Rd, Regent Dr, 22nd St, Castle Dr, Illinois Highway 38, Fillmore St, Adams St, Madison St, Euclid Ave, York St, and Illinois Highway 64.

The 6th and 4th districts are partitioned by Grand Ave, Frontage Ave, Fullerton Ave, Harvard Ave, Armitage Ave, Addison Rd, Illinois Highway 64, Westmore Ave/Berman Ave, Plymouth St, Lincoln St, Vermont St, Westwood Ave, Le Moyne Ave/Illinois Highway 64, Highway 355, Union Pacific Railroad, North Path, President St, and Naperville Rd.

The 6th and 11th district are partitioned by Illinois Highway 23, Highway 88, Fender Rd, Ogden Ave, Beau Bren Blvd, Eugenia Dr, Arlington Ave, Oak Hill Park, Oak Hill Dr, Yackley Ave, Maple Ave, Abbey Dr, Four Lakes Ave, River Bend Golf Course, Riverview Dr, Kohl Rd, Illinois Highway 53, 61st St, Essex Rd, Summerhill Park, Prentiss Creek, 59th St, Chase Ave, 63rd St, Highway 355, Wheeler St, Woodward Ave, 71st Ave, Illinois Highway 33, Illinois Highway 9, 87th St, Meyer Woods Park, Wards Creek, Highway 55, Cass Ave, and 91st St. The 6th district takes in the municipalities of Downers Grove, Lombard, Villa Park, Westmont; most of Elmhurst, Lisle, and Darien; half of Wheaton east of Illinois Highway 23 and south of the Union Pacific Railroad; and the portion of Glen Ellyn south of the Union Pacific Railroad.

Recent statewide election results

Prominent representatives

Recent election results

2016

2018

2020

2022

List of members representing the district

Historical district boundaries

See also
Illinois's congressional districts
Illinois's  6th congressional district election, 2006
List of United States congressional districts

References

 Congressional Biographical Directory of the United States 1774–present

External links
6th District of Illinois, The Washington Post 
6th District Fact Sheet, U.S. Census Bureau

06
Congress-06
DuPage County, Illinois
Constituencies established in 1843
1843 establishments in Illinois